Thrintoft is a village and civil parish in the Hambleton district of North Yorkshire, England.

Thrintoft is mentioned in the Domesday Book as being in the possession of Picot of Lascelles. One of his descendants, Roger de Lascelles, gifted the village to St Mary's Abbey in York around 1146. The name derives from Old Norse and is registered in the Domesday Book as Tirnetofte. It is believed to mean the thorn-bush by (or in) the field.

Whilst the parish has a population of 185, North Yorkshire County Council estimated that the population of the village was 140 at the 2011 census and remained at that number in 2015.

The village is recorded as having a corn mill in 1539, which led to the stream flowing south west through the settlement into the River Swale being named Mill Beck. The chapel of St Mary Magdalen, now a barn, was built during the 13th to 15th centuries. It was endowed in 1253 as a chantry chapel connected to Jervaulx Abbey and is a grade II* listed building. The chapel is the only surviving building from Thrintoft Grange.

The village has a pub, The New Inn.

References

External links

Villages in North Yorkshire
Civil parishes in North Yorkshire